The Staff was an underground newspaper published in Los Angeles in the 1970s, printing many anti-war articles, and also covering the music scene and popular culture. The entire second section of the paper, normally devoted to the arts and music, was put together by the music group Devo.

Publication history 
The Staff came into existence as a result of the temporary demise of the Los Angeles Free Press, which had been founded and published by Art Kunkin. Around 1970, the L.A. Free Press failed to make an employee tax payment and the paper was seized by the Internal Revenue Service. As a result, much of the staff of the Free Press, led by managing editor Brian Kirby and art director Phil Wilson, left to form their own newspaper, calling it The Staff.

They first moved into quarters on Santa Monica Boulevard near Cahuenga Boulevard, in Hollywood, California.  They later relocated to Hollywood Boulevard, just west of Western Avenue, in offices above a movie theater that was at that time showing softcore pornography.

On one occasion, gonzo journalist Hunter S. Thompson came by the paper for a social visit with some of the staff, after they had published a review of his book Fear and Loathing in Las Vegas.

The Staff ran for 90 weekly issues before it folded.

The Staff staff  and contributors 

 Brian Kirby, editor
 Philip Wilson, art director/publisher
 Colman Andrews, food writer — penned his first regular restaurant reviews for the paper, beginning in 1971, under the pseudonym Mr. Food. (Art Ginsberg didn't start using that name for his Mr. Food cooking shows until four years later.)
 Bob Chorush, columnist
 Mark Coppos, photographer
 Ridgely Cummings, writer
 Clay Geerdes, photographer and writer — wrote regularly for the paper on the underground comix industry, as well as supplying some photographs.
 Lenny Marcus, writer
 Tom Moran, writer
 Bill Morrison, writer
 Thomas Warkentin, cartoonist
 Joyce Widoff, photographer

See also
 List of underground newspapers of the 1960s counterculture

References

External links 
 The Staff page at Zappa Books

Newspapers published in Greater Los Angeles
Publications established in 1970
Underground press